Puketāpapa is a local government area in Auckland, in New Zealand's Auckland Region. It is governed by the Puketāpapa Local Board and Auckland Council, and is located within the council's Albert-Eden-Puketāpapa Ward.

Geography

The area includes the suburbs of Wesley, Three Kings, Mt Roskill, Royal Oak, Hillsborough, Waikowhai and Lynfield.

It borders the Manukau Harbour and includes two volcanic cones:

 Puketāpapa / Pukewīwī / Mount Roskill
 Te Tātua-a-Riukiuta / Three Kings

Features

Keith Hay Park and Monte Cecilia Park are located within Puketāpapa.

There are also reserves on both volcanic cones.

References